The Ven.  James Rice Buckley , BD  (28 January 1849 – 8 September 1924) was Archdeacon of Llandaff from 1913  until his death.

He was educated at  Carmarthen Grammar School and St David's College, Lampeter; and ordained in 1872. After a curacy in Neath he was Vicar of Llandaff from 1878 to   1913. He was later a  Surrogate  for the Diocese of Llandaff ; then its Rural Dean.

There is a statue of him on Llandaff’s Cathedral Green.

References

1849 births
1924 deaths
People educated at Carmarthen Grammar School
Alumni of the University of Wales, Lampeter
British accountants
Archdeacons of Llandaff